Irvington is a town on the Rappahannock River in Lancaster County, Virginia, United States. The population was 432 at the 2010 census. Located on a peninsula known as the Northern Neck, it has been designated a historic district.

History
From 1871 until 1893, the town was called "Carter's Creek Wharf" or simply "Carter's Creek", since steamboats docked at the relatively deep water confluence of a tributary that had much earlier been called "Cossotomen Creek" and later "Carter's Creek" after early settler John Carter, Sr., the father of the powerful colonial era politician King Carter, who was the Virginia agent for the Northern Neck Proprietary. The town formally adopted the name "Irvington" to honor Baltimore native Captain Levin Irvington following a 1891 referendum, since mail had been often confused between this town and that of Center Cross in relatively nearby Essex County. 

The original Chesapeake Academy, 1889–1907, was located in Irvington. One of its graduates, Claybrook Cottingham, was later its assistant principal and subsequently in his long academic career the president of both Louisiana College in Pineville and Louisiana Tech University in Ruston.

Historic district

The historic district, Irvington, also known as Carters Creek, is a  area that was listed on the National Register of Historic Places in 2000.  In 2000, it included 149 contributing buildings, 3 contributing sites and one other contributing structure.

Geography
Irvington is located at  (37.6615, −76.4191).

According to the United States Census Bureau, the town has a total area of 1.8 square miles (4.7 km2), of which, 1.5 square miles (3.9 km2) of it is land and 0.3 square miles (0.9 km2) of it (18.13%) is water.

Demographics

As of the census of 2000, there were 673 people, 240 households, and 174 families residing in the town. The population density was 449.0 people per square mile (173.2/km2). There were 325 housing units at an average density of 216.8 per square mile (83.7/km2). The racial makeup of the town was 98.37% White, 1.49% African American and 0.15% Asian.

There were 240 households, out of which 20.4% had children under the age of 18 living with them, 63.8% were married couples living together, 7.5% had a female householder with no husband present, and 27.1% were non-families. 25.8% of all households were made up of individuals, and 14.6% had someone living alone who was 65 years of age or older. The average household size was 2.19 and the average family size was 2.61.

In the town, the population was spread out, with 13.8% under the age of 18, 2.5% from 18 to 24, 13.2% from 25 to 44, 24.1% from 45 to 64, and 46.4% who were 65 years of age or older. The median age was 63 years. For every 100 females there were 79.5 males. For every 100 females age 18 and over, there were 72.6 males.

The median income for a household in the town was $60,139, and the median income for a family was $68,438. Males had a median income of $42,500 versus $25,938 for females. The per capita income for the town was $50,743. About 1.1% of families and 3.5% of the population were below the poverty line, including 5.1% of those under age 18 and 3.7% of those age 65 or over.

Features and amenities 

Irvington is the home of the marine resort The Tides Inn. On King Carter Drive is the Steamboat Museum, which details the history of the steamboats that traveled the Chesapeake Bay and stopped in Irvington.

Lancaster National Bank (later Chesapeake National Bank and currently Chesapeake Bank) was formed in Irvington in 1900 to cater to the growing town. Irvington was also a stop for Chesapeake National Bank's Boat 'n Bank, a houseboat with bank tellers that cruised the Rappahannock River wharves, canneries and oyster houses. The town has a club, Rappahannock River Yacht Club, and a marina, Irvington Marina.

Children of the town attend Lancaster County Public Schools and there is one independent school located in Irvington.  Reopened in 1965, Chesapeake Academy serves children from 3 years old through eighth grade. Chesapeake Academy's original 1890 schoolhouse is located on King Carter Drive; it is now the Hope & Glory Inn. Next door to the schoolhouse is the Irvington Methodist Church; its parsonage is now a women's clothing store, The Dandelion.

Since the 1970s winemaking has become a growing vocation in the region, with a number of wineries located nearby.  Irvington is located within the Northern Neck George Washington Birthplace American Viticultural Area winemaking appellation.

References

External links

Official travel/tourism website LoveIrvington
Rappahannock Record – Local newspaper
 Irvington, Virginia is at coordinates .

National Register of Historic Places in Lancaster County, Virginia
Towns in Lancaster County, Virginia
Historic districts on the National Register of Historic Places in Virginia